Pinedjem (“the pleasant one”) was the name of two ancient Egyptian High Priests of Amun.

 Pinedjem I
 Pinedjem II, his grandson

There was also a Fourth Prophet of Amun by this name, a son of Tjanefer and Gautseshen.